Jastrabie pri Michalovciach is a village and municipality in Michalovce District in the Kosice Region of eastern Slovakia.

History
In historical records the village was first mentioned in 1337.

Geography
The village lies at an altitude of 104 metres and covers an area of  (2020-06-30/-07-01).

Ethnicity
The population is about 99% Slovak in ethnicity.

Culture
The village has a small public library, a football pitch and a food store.

Notable people
Steve Ihnat, actor and director

Genealogical resources

The records for genealogical research are available at the state archive "Statny Archiv in Presov, Slovakia"

 Roman Catholic church records (births/marriages/deaths): 1863-1926 (parish B)
 Greek Catholic church records (births/marriages/deaths): 1811-1898 (parish B)

See also
 List of municipalities and towns in Slovakia

References

External links
https://web.archive.org/web/20070513023228/http://www.statistics.sk/mosmis/eng/run.html
Surnames of living people in Jastrabie pri Michalovciach

Villages and municipalities in Michalovce District